The 1978–79 Pacific Tigers men's basketball team represented the University of the Pacific during the 1978–79 NCAA Division I men's basketball season. The Tigers were led by 7th-year head coach Stan Morrison and played their home games at the Stockton Memorial Civic Auditorium in Stockton, California as members of the Pacific Coast Athletic Association.

Roster

Schedule and results

|-
!colspan=9 style=| Regular season

|-
!colspan=9 style=| PCAA tournament

|-
!colspan=9 style=| NCAA tournament

Source:

Notes

References

Pacific Tigers men's basketball seasons
Pacific
Pacific
Pacific
Pacific